Mike John is the pseudonym of an American pornographic movie producer, director, and actor.

Biography

John started in the industry as a videographer for Sean Michaels in 1996. He joined Anabolic Video in 1998 as a director with his first series, Panochitas. He became successful at Anabolic with his point-of-view (POV) series, A Perverted Point of View. He is credited for mentoring Lexington Steele and Erik Everhard as directors.

He left Anabolic and joined Red Light District Video (RLD) in 2003. He directed 27 titles for the banner before leaving in January 2006. After leaving RLD, John obtained a permanent injunction against his former company when RLD advertised several series on its website, No Cum Dodging, Boobaholics, and Teen Spermaholics that were confusingly similar to John's series, No Cum Dodging Allowed, Boobaholics Anonymous, and Teenage Spermaholics.

John signed a distribution deal with Jules Jordan Video (JJV) in 2006. John retained full ownership of his titles and the company would earn a percentage for distributing them. His first movie for JJV was the interracial title, Racial Tension which won several awards.

Awards
2006 Adam Film World Award for Best P.O.V. Series - P.O.V. Pervert
2007 AVN Award for Best Interracial Release - Racial Tension
2007 Adam Film World Award for Best Interracial Movie - Racial Tension
2008 Adam Film World Award for Best Interracial Movie - Racial Tension 2
2010 AVN Award for Best Gonzo Series - Jerkoff Material
2010 XRCO Award for Best POV Movie - POV Pervert 11
2011 XRCO Award for Best POV Series - POV Pervert
2012 XRCO Award for Best POV Series - POV Pervert
2013 XRCO Award for Best POV Series - POV Pervert
2014 AVN Hall of Fame inductee

References

External links 
 
 
 
 

American male pornographic film actors
Living people
American pornographic film directors
1966 births
American pornographic film producers